, also known monomously as Harvey, is a Japanese singer and model. She is a member of the girl group XG.

Early life

Amy Harvey was born to an Australian father and a Japanese mother. She is an only child. When she was in fifth grade, she studied cheer dance, and in her first year of middle school, she transitioned to hip-hop dance with aspirations of becoming a rapper. In the same year, at the suggestion of her mother and being inspired by Miranda Kerr, Harvey decided to pursue modeling. Harvey was later scouted at a large dance competition that she took part in.

Career

At the age of 13, Harvey took part in the 2016 , a modeling audition organized by Tokyo Girls Collection, Avex Group, and Ameba. She won the competition along with five other finalists. During the audition, she received awards from the magazines Soup, Nylon Japan, Bea's Up, Popteen, and Love Berry, winning the most awards over the other finalists. Following the event, Harvey modeled for issues 4 and 5 of Love Berry and the November 2016 issue of Vivi.

With aspirations of becoming a singer, Harvey announced she was part of Avex Artist Academy in 2017. In March 2017, Harvey became the face of the make-up campaign So Good in Colors, a collaboration between MAC Cosmetics and Vogue Japan. Harvey also modeled in the seasonal promotions for the hair salon Shima, as well as for Elle Girl and Nylon Japan. In 2018, Harvey modeled at the Amazon Fashion Week Tokyo Spring/Summer show and the 27th Tokyo Girls Collection Autumn/Winter show.

After 5 years of training at Avex, on March 18, 2022, Harvey debuted as a singer through the girl group XG through Xgalx.

Discography

External links

2002 births
Living people
Japanese female models
Japanese women pop singers
Japanese people of Australian descent
21st-century Japanese women singers